The croaking gourami (Trichopsis vittata) is a species of small freshwater labyrinth fish of the gourami family. They are native to still waters in Southeast Asia and are distributed worldwide via the aquarium trade. Croaking gouramis are capable of producing a "croaking" noise using their pectoral fins.

General 
Croaking gouramis can reach an average size of about 5 centimeters, though some individuals can grow as large as 6 or 7 centimeters. Coloration is highly variable, ranging from pale brown and green to dark purple with black or red spots on the fins. 2-4 brown or black stripes or rows of spots are present on their sides. Median fins have a thin iridescent blue coloration on their edges. The iris of the eye is bright blue or purple. Females tend to be paler than males, have a slightly rounded dorsal fin and a shorter anal fin. Most croaking gouramis live for about 2 years but with proper care can live as long as 5 in an aquarium setting. They are native to stillwater habitats including ponds, canals and paddy fields in Java, Borneo, Sumatra, Malaya, Thailand, Laos, Cambodia, and Vietnam. A breeding population is known to exist in a series of drainage ditches in Palm Beach County, Florida, USA, almost certainly introduced there through the aquarium industry.

As their name suggests, croaking gouramis are capable of producing an audible grunting or chirping noise, accomplished through the use of specialized adaptations of their pectoral fins. These noises are produced by both sexes during breeding displays and during the establishment of dominance hierarchies among males. A typical showdown between males consists of each fish circling the other, flaring fins, aggressively darting (though rarely making contact), and producing croaking noises. Well matched individuals may continue this behaviour for several hours at a time.

In aquaria 
Croaking gouramis are fairly shy, peaceful fish that do well in most community aquaria and do not cause problems with other tankmates. Males can be fairly territorial and aggressive with each other during breeding periods, but will not cause harm given a large enough aquarium, and usually males comfortably coexist. They require a tank no smaller than 40 litres (10 US gallons), preferably larger, and each pair of males will need about 20 inches of space to feel comfortable with one another. Croaking gouramis will prowl about all areas of the aquarium, preferring to lurk among reeds and under large leaves close to the water surface. At night, they might be found "sleeping" at the bottom, even resting on the substrate (which is not normally a cause for concern), or hovering motionless at the water surface.

Like all members of the suborder Anabantoidei, the croaking gourami can breathe atmospheric oxygen from above the water surface using a specialized labyrinth organ if necessary. It is important, therefore, that the surface of the water be exposed to fresh air, usually accomplished by keeping them in an open-top tank or using a hood that allows air ventilation. If the tank has good air pumps, this is not always needed, since the air pumps will refresh the air above the water. Very cold air temperatures at the water surface may lead to infections of the labyrinth organ.

The aquarium should be heavily planted and have at least part of the surface shaded by broad leaves or floating plants. Croaking gouramis will become severely stressed in bare tanks without various hiding places. A darker substrate will make them feel comfortable and help show off their subtle colors. Like most gouramis, these fish are susceptible to diseases and infections, so regular water changes are a must. They are tolerant of fairly high temperatures. This can be used to eliminate fish diseases such as ich from the aquarium. Temperatures of 84 °F (29 °C) are easily tolerated though 26 °C seems to be close to optimal. A pH of 6.8 is about right and peat filtration is often recommended.

Croaking gouramis should not be kept with large, aggressive fish, but are compatible with other small, peaceful fish as well as with fellow gouramis. They will be targeted by male Bettas so they should not be kept with them. They are very sensitive to noise and the tank should be in a quiet area.

Diet 
In the wild, croaking gouramis are mostly insectivorous, feeding on insects and insect larvae, however other food types, such as zooplankton, crustaceans, shrimp meat and occasionally plant matter, are eaten as well. In aquaria, a varied diet is important to their long-term health; standard flake foods along with regular supplements of freeze-dried bloodworms, tubifex worms, brine shrimp, and some algae-based flakes will provide these fish with proper nutrition. Occasional feedings of live brine shrimp offer the aquarist an opportunity to observe the natural hunting behaviour of croaking gouramis.

Breeding 
Sex can be most reliably determined by candling but the more common approach is to observe the shape of the dorsal fin: the male's dorsal fin is pointed, while the female's is rounded. The male croaking gourami is a bubblenest builder, creating a small nest from air bubbles and mucous under a leaf. The water level should be reduced to 8 inches during spawning, circulation kept minimal, and the temperature should be approximately 28 °C (82 °F). Spawning occurs under the nest, with the female responding to the male's dance by rolling over, followed by the typical gourami embrace. About 5 to 10 eggs are released in a quick burst. The male will grab the eggs and spit them into the nest, often adding a few more bubbles for good measure. This act may be repeated a dozen times or more, until about 100 eggs are laid. Some large females may lay more than 200. After spawning the female should be moved to a different tank. The male will keep the bubblenest maintained and tend to the eggs and fry, but when the fry are 2–3 days old the male should also be removed. When first hatched, the fry should be fed infusoria, and later, baby brine shrimp and finely ground flakes. Freeze-dried tablets may also be fed to older fry. It is important that the breeding and grow-out tanks be covered and protected from cool drafts, as low air temperatures above the water surface may cause damage to the developing labyrinth organs of the young fish when they begin to take gulps of air.

Notes

References 
 
 
 Ladich, F., W. Brtittenger, and H. Kratochvil (1992). Significance Of Agonistic Vocalization In The Croaking Gourami.
 Shafland, P. L. (1996). "Exotic Fishes of Florida-1994". Reviews in Fisheries Science 4(2).
 Sterba, G. (1983). The Aquarium Fish Encyclopedia. The MIT Press.

Croaking gourami
Fishkeeping
Fish of Southeast Asia
Fish of Thailand
Freshwater fish of Indonesia
Freshwater fish of Malaysia
Fish described in 1831
Taxa named by Georges Cuvier